Tennessee Creek is a stream in Cass County in the U.S. state of Missouri.

Tennessee Creek was named for the fact that a share of the pioneer settlers in the area came from the state of Tennessee.

See also
List of rivers of Missouri

References

Rivers of Cass County, Missouri
Rivers of Missouri